Karlina is a Danish, Faroese, Norwegian and  Slovene feminine given name that is an alternate form of Karla and a short form of Karolina. Karlīna is a Latvian feminine given name that is a feminine form of K%C4%81rlis. Notable people known by this name include the following:

Given name
Karlīna Miksone (born 2000), Latvian football player
Karlina Leksono Supelli (born 1958), Indonesian philosopher and astronomer

Middle name
Lisa Karlina Lumongdong (born 1968), Indonesian chess master

See also

Carlina (name)
Kalina (given name)
Kalina (surname)
Karina (name)
Karlin (surname)
Karline
Karolina

Notes

Danish feminine given names 
Faroese feminine given names
Norwegian feminine given names
Slovene feminine given names